Mount Wuling is a mountain located at the border of Xinglong County, Chengde, Hebei Province and Miyun District, Beijing. It is the main peak of Yan Mountains, with a height of 2118 m above sea level.

The mount raised during the Yanshanian movement period; Yanshanian syenites are usually found in the main part of it. The soil developed from granite residual soil. Its average temperature is 7.9 °C.

References

External links
 Wuling Mountain

Mountains of Beijing
Miyun District